The List of theatres and campaigns of World War II subdivides military operations of World War II and contemporary wars by war, then by theater and then by campaign.

Pre–World War II

Asia 
 Japanese invasion of Manchuria (September 18, 1931 – February 26, 1932)
 January 28 incident (January 28 – March 3, 1932)
 Defense of the Great Wall (January 1 – May 31, 1933)
 Action in Inner Mongolia (May 26 – October, 1933)
 Suiyuan campaign (October – November 1936)
 Soviet-Japanese Border War (May 11 – September 16, 1939)
 Second Sino-Japanese War (July 7, 1937 – December 7, 1941)

Europe and Africa 
 Second Italo-Abyssinian War (October 3, 1935 – February 19, 1937)
 Spanish Civil War (July 17, 1936 – April 1, 1939)
 S-Plan (January 16, 1939 – March 1940)
 Slovak-Hungarian War (March 23 – 31, 1939)
 Italian invasion of Albania (April 7–12, 1939)

Campaigns

European Theatre

Nordic Front
 List of military operations in the Nordic countries during World War II
 Invasion of Denmark and Norway (April–June 1940)
 Continuation war (June 25, 1941 – September 19, 1944)
 Lapland War (October 1, 1944 – April 25, 1945)
 Liberation of Finnmark (October 23, 1944 - April 26, 1945)

Western Front

 Phony War (Oct 1939-April 1940)
 Battle of France (with Benelux countries/Fall Gelb) (May–June 1940)
 Battle of Britain ( + Operation Sea Lion Unternehmen Seelöwe ) (July–October 1940)
 Western Front (1944–1945)
 Supreme Headquarters Allied Expeditionary Force (SHAEF) commanded Allied forces in north west Europe, from late 1943 until May 1945.
 Battle of Normandy (June–August 1944)
 Northern France Campaign (July–September 1944)
 Southern France Campaign (Operation Dragoon) (August–September 1944)
 Battle of the Siegfried Line (Rhineland Campaign, Ardennes-Alsace Campaign) (August–December 1944)
 Central Europe Campaign (March–May 1945)

Eastern Front

 Eastern Front (initially Operation Barbarossa) (June 1941 to May 1945)
 Continuation War (Finland) (June 1941-September 1944)

Mediterranean, African and Middle East Theatre

 Allied Force Headquarters (AFHQ), controlled all forces in the Mediterranean Theatre late 1942  to May 1945.
 Gibraltar (9 September 1939 – 28 May 1944)
 Adriatic Sea (7 April 1939 – 15 May 1945)
 Palestine (June 1940 – June 1941)
 East Africa (10 June 1940 – 27 November 1941)
 North Africa (10 June 1940 – 13 May 1943)
Western Desert (11 June 1940 – 4 February 1943)
French North Africa (	8–16 November 1942)
Tunisia (17 November 1942 – 13 May 1943)
 Malta (11 June 1940 – 20 November 1942)
 Bahrain (19 October 1940)
 Greco-Italian War (28 October 1940 to April 1941)
 Invasion of Yugoslavia (Operation Punishment) (April 1941)
 Battle of Greece (Operation Marita) (April 1941)
 Crete (Operation Mercury) (May–June 1941)
 World War II in Yugoslavia (April 1941 to May 1945)
 Iraq (2–31 May 1941)
 Syria-Lebanon (8 June – 14 July 1941)
 Iran (25–31 August 1941)
 Sicily (9 July – 17 August 1943)
 Italy (10 July 1943 - 2 May 1945)
 Corsica (August 1943)
 Dodecanese (8 September – 22 November 1943)
 Southern France (15 August – 14 September 1944)
 Alpes-Maritimes (23 March - 2 May 1945)

Pacific-Asian Theatre

 Second Sino-Japanese War (December 8, 1941 – September 9, 1945)
 Pacific War
 American-British-Dutch-Australian Command
 Pacific Theater of Operations
Pacific Ocean Areas
South West Pacific Area
 South-East Asian Theatre
Burma Campaign
China Burma India Theatre
 Japan
Volcano and Ryukyu Islands campaign
Soviet-Japanese War (1945)
Soviet Manchurian Campaign (1945)

Other theatres
 Americas
 Australia
 Arctic and Antarctica
 West Africa (1940)
 Madagascar (1942)

Naval wars
 Battle of the Atlantic
 Arctic Convoys (Operation Rösselsprung)
 Battle of the Mediterranean
 Battle of the Indian Ocean

Air wars
 Battle of Britain
 Strategic bombing during World War II
 Atomic bombings of Hiroshima and Nagasaki

Contemporary wars
 Chinese Civil War (April 12, 1927 – May 1, 1950)
 Second Sino-Japanese War (July 7, 1937 – December 7, 1941)
 S-Plan (January 16, 1939 - March, 1940)
 Soviet-Japanese Border War (May 11, 1939 – September 16, 1939)
 Winter War (November 1939-March 1940)
 French-Thai War (September 1, 1940 – May 9, 1941)
 Ecuadorian–Peruvian War (July 5, 1941 – January 31, 1942)
 Northern Campaign (September 2, 1942 - December, 1944)
 Greek Civil War (December 3, 1944 – October 16, 1949)
 Afghan tribal revolts (April 1944 – 11 January 1947)

See also

 
 
 
 

 01
 
Theaters
 
World War II